Charles Edward Montague (1 January 1867 – 28 May 1928) was an English journalist, known also as a writer of novels and essays.

Biography
Montague was born and brought up in London, the son of an Irish Roman Catholic priest who had left his vocation to marry. He was educated at the City of London School and Balliol College, Oxford. At Oxford he gained a First in Classical Moderations (1887) and a Second in Literae Humaniores (1889). In 1890 he was recruited by C. P. Scott to The Manchester Guardian, where he became a leader writer and critic; while Scott was an M.P. between 1895 and 1906 he was de facto editor of the paper. He married Scott's daughter Madeline in 1898. While working at the paper, Montague became a supporter of Irish Home Rule.

Montague was against the First World War prior to its commencement, but once it started he believed that it was right to support it in the hope of a swift resolution. In 1914, Montague was 47, which was well over the age for enlistment. But in order to enlist, he dyed his white hair black to enable him to fool the Army into accepting him. H. W. Nevinson would later write that "Montague is the only man I know whose white hair in a single night turned dark through courage." He began as a grenadier-sergeant, and rose to lieutenant and then captain of intelligence in 1915. Later in the war, he became an armed escort for VIPs visiting the battlefield. He escorted such personalities as H.G. Wells and Bernard Shaw. After the end of World War I he wrote in a strong anti-war vein. He wrote that "War hath no fury like a non-combatant." Disenchantment (1922), a collection of newspaper articles about the war, was one of the first prose works to strongly criticise the way the war was fought, and is regarded by some as a pivotal text in the development of literature about the First World War. Disenchantment criticised the British Press' coverage of the war and the conduct of the British generals. Montague accused the latter of being influenced by the "public school ethos" which he condemned as a "gallant robust contempt for "swats" and for all who invented new means to new ends and who trained and used their brains with a will".

He returned to The Manchester Guardian, but felt that his role was diminishing as the years passed.  He finally retired in 1925, and settled down to become a full-time writer in the last years of his life.  He died in 1928 at the age of 61.

Montague was the father of Evelyn Montague, the Olympic athlete and journalist depicted in the 1981 film Chariots of Fire.

Media portrayal
Charles Edward Montague is one of the 14 main characters of the series 14 - Diaries of the Great War. He is played by actor David Acton.

Works
Dramatic Values (1911), reviews
The Morning's War (1913), a novel
Disenchantment (1922), essays [thoughts on the First World War]
Fiery Particles (1923), short stories
A Hind Let Loose (1924), a novel
The Right Place (1924), travel writing
Rough Justice (1926), a novel
Right off the Map (1927), a science fiction novel
Action (1928), short stories
A Writer's Notes on His Trade (1930)
"Two or Three Witnesses", a short story

Notes

References
C. E. Montague: A Memoir (1929) by Oliver Elton

External links
 
 C. E. Montague Papers at John Rylands Library, Manchester.

1867 births
1928 deaths
Writers from London
English essayists
20th-century English novelists
English male journalists
People educated at the City of London School
English people of Irish descent
British male essayists
English male novelists
20th-century essayists
20th-century English male writers